Hakken (sometimes Hakkûh) is a form of rave dance originating from the Dutch hardcore and gabber scene. The dance is very similar to earlier European folk dance and is thought to be a sub form of zapateo with less airborne moves (unlike jumpstyle, for example, which features the "drunken sailor" style of jazz dance and high kicks). Music one is able to do the dance to is also called hakmuziek. The name is derived from the Dutch verb hakken which means chopping, or hacking, or refers the heels of the feet.

Despite the fact that it is called gabber, it is usually performed to music of the rawstyle and frenchcore genre by most ravers in Australia.

The dance consists of small steps that quickly follow each other to the rhythm of the bass drum. The lower body (down from the pelvis) is the most important part, though it is not unusual to move the arms and torso too. Because one is supposed to keep up to the beat of the song, the dance is usually done fairly quickly, since the BPM of this music style can easily reach 190 BPM.

References 

Dance in the Netherlands
Hardcore (electronic dance music genre)
Dutch dances
20th-century dance